TBL or .TBL may refer to:

Mediant
 The Beautiful Life: TBL, a 2009 American television series

Computing
 tbl, a UNIX preprocessor that formats tables
 .TBL, a file extension for a table in List of filename extensions (S–Z)
 TRANS.TBL, a file on Compact Disc computer filesystems

Sports
 Thailand Basketball League
 The Basketball League
 Turkish Basketball First League
 Tampa Bay Lightning

Other uses
 Transmission balise-locomotive, a Belgian train protection system
 Team-based learning
 Tanzania Breweries Limited, a Tanzanian brewery firm
 Triple bottom line (TBL or 3BL), an accounting framework
 Tboli language (ISO 639:tbl)
 Tall building lawyer, a lawyer working for a law firm (often a biglaw firm) that serves large corporations and wealthy individuals

See also
 Tim Berners-Lee, inventor of the World Wide Web